This is a list of people of Baltic ethnicities who were awarded the title Hero of the Soviet Union. It does not include non-Baltic peoples, such as Russians and Ukrainians, who resided in the Baltic republics.

Estonian
 August Allik ru
 Aleksander Viljamson ru
 Genrikh Gendreus ru
 Helene Kullman
 Jakob Kunder ru
 Ludvig Kurist ru
 Joosep Laar ru
 Arnold Meri
 Arnold Papel ru
 Endel Puusepp
 Albert Repson ru

Latvian
 Pols Armāns
 Jānis Bērziņš ru
 Jānis Vilhelms ru
 Aleksandr Gruzdin ru
 Peteris Zudov ru
 Ivans Krūmiņš ru
 Otomārs Oškalns
 Peteris Pumpurs
 Pavel Purin ru
 Jānis Rainbergs ru
 Vilis Samsons ru
 Imants Sudmalis
 Jānis Fogelis ru

Lithuanian
 Juozas Aleksonis ru
 Stanislovas Apyvala ru
 Vaclovas Bernotėnas ru
 Jonas Blaževičius ru
 Hubertas Borisa ru
 Alfonsas Čeponis ru
 Boleslovas Gėgžnas ru
 Jonas Kostin ru
 Marytė Melnikaitė
 Viktoras Poznyak ru
 Stasys Šeinauskas ru
 Yakov Smushkevich (twice)
 Bronius Urbanavičius ru
 Stanislovas Vaupšas ru
 Juozas Vitas
 Viktoras Jacenevičius ru

References 

 
 Russian Ministry of Defence Database «Подвиг Народа в Великой Отечественной войне 1941—1945 гг.» [Feat of the People in the Great Patriotic War 1941-1945] (in Russian).

Heroes of the Soviet Union lists